John Reid (born 1968) is a Dutch cartoonist and judge.

Reid was born in 1968 in Utrecht. Reid makes the cartoon Fokke & Sukke with Bastiaan Geleijnse and Jean-Marc van Tol. Originally, the cartoon was published in the satirical student newspaper Propria Cures. Since 1999, it is published in the national newspaper NRC Handelsblad. Reid, Geleijnse, and Van Tol won the Stripschapprijs in 2003.

He studied law. He has been a judge at the court of justice in Alkmaar since 2002. As of 2016 he is also the new host of the TV show  in which civil disputes are settled.

References

1968 births
Living people
Dutch cartoonists
Dutch comics writers
Dutch satirists
Dutch editorial cartoonists
21st-century Dutch judges
Artists from Utrecht
Winners of the Stripschapsprijs
Mass media people from Utrecht (city)